Thallarcha staurocola is a moth in the subfamily Arctiinae. It was described by Edward Meyrick in 1886. It is found in Australia, where it has been recorded from New South Wales, Queensland and Victoria.

References

Moths described in 1886
Lithosiini